Nathalie Daoust (born March 31, 1977) is a Canadian photographer and contemporary artist.

Biography 
Daoust studied photography at the Cégep du Vieux Montreal (1994–1997).  Upon graduating, she moved to New York City, where she spent two years inhabiting and photographing the uniquely themed rooms of the Carlton Arms Hotel.  These images comprise her first book, New York Hotel Story, published in 2002. New York Hotel Story introduces many of the themes she grapples with in subsequent works, including identity, gender, sexuality, time and memory, and escapism.

Her photographs focus on exposing hidden desires and dreams, frequently manifested in the margins of society.  Too often this margin is inhabited by women, as many of her projects attest. From portraits of female sex workers in Brazil and Japan, to the role of women in contemporary Chinese society, Daoust explores the darker side of the construction of female identity.

Daoust is led by her desire to understand the human impulse to construct experiences that allow us to live, for at least a moment, in a fictive world.  From female dominatrices at a Japanese S&M hotel in Tokyo Hotel Story, to one man’s decision to discard his own identity in favour of another's in Impersonating Mao, her work inhabits the liminal space between fiction and truth. Her most conceptually complex project to date, Korean Dreams, explores the ideological manifestation of a fantasy.  While traveling through North Korea she observed the manipulation of reality on a national scale, capturing the layers of forced illusion perpetuated by the North Korean government.

Employing a variety of means to address her subjects, Daoust's technique plays a crucial role in communicating content. She employs non-digital techniques so that the process of creating the image itself contributes to her conceptual explorations.

On 4 October 2014, Daoust married Jonathan Douglas-Scott-Montagu, a biochemist who is the younger half-brother of Lord Montagu of Beaulieu.

Nathalie Daoust is currently working on her new project about Mongolia. She aims to portrait the Mongolian nomadic families who are forced to abandon completely their way of life and move to the capital due to the effects of global warming and modernisation. These local tribes from the steppe have wiped out their livestock in the last increasingly severe winters, and are now settling into the Ger district, a "tent city" made of Yurts in Ulaanbaatar. These vast neighbours nowadays represent 62% of the population of the capital.

Projects 

New York Hotel Story

In 1997 Daoust was invited to decorate a room in the Carlton Arms Hotel in New York City – a hotel that, for the past 40 years, has invited artists such as Banksy, Andre Charles and Paco Simone to transform its rooms and walls. Daoust created a ‘childhood dreamland’ crowded with games and plush animals and fully painted in Crayola-bright colours. After completing her room, Daoust was inspired to live in the Carlton Arms Hotel, intending to explore it photographically. For the following two years, she stayed alternately in every room to absorb each artist’s singular universe. The resultant images explore the interaction between subject and closed environment, engaging with the uncertainty of self as each room becomes a microcosmic world.

These photos were published in a book of the same name in 2002.

Tokyo Girls

Tokyo Girls is an animation-like picture series capturing 30 women from around the world, united in Japan to perform striptease. Photographed using lenticular technology – a technique that imparts the illusion of movement – the women seem to dance, vamp and primp in front of our eyes, caught in a perpetual loop of seduction and solicitation. While their fate could seem melancholy, the dancers have a certain light-hearted frivolity, epitomized by the woman who winks coyly at us while performing her dance.

Despite sharing the same occupation, each portrait represents a unique individual. Photographed against a white backdrop, the women are able to tell their own stories by communicating via movement and expression. Daoust does not allow them to become stereotypes, but lets them reveal the conscious artifice of their trade.

Entre Quatre Murs, Berlin

Focusing on the construction of female identity, Entre Quatre Murs, Berlin, is a series of compositions involving women and space. Each image is a composite of elements, separated from the original photograph and printed on layers of transparent orthochromatic film. By superimposing these layers, the image is reconstituted three-dimensionally.

This sequence of three-dimensional portraits transparentizes the female body, as Daoust interweaves her subjects with their surroundings until the distinction between self and environment almost disappears. By dissolving these confines dividing external and interior, the scenes reflect and suggest a microcosmic snapshot of the mind.

Street Kiss, Brazil

In Street Kiss, Daoust has captured the living and working conditions of the female sex workers of the Nicacio brothel in Rio de Janeiro. The Nicacio is both a place of the quick, downmarket sex trade and a space decorated by artists; the girls who work there have also founded a fashion label, Daspu, to fund workers benefits for prostitutes.

As a female photographer Daoust disrupts the exchange between subject and traditional viewer, allowing these women to exist not as passive objects of the male gaze but as active participants in the creation of their gendered identity.  In this way the women, the art, and the fight for dignity in life all come together.

Frozen in Time, Switzerland

Set in an ambiguous territory where dream and reality clash, this series of hand painted black and white pinhole images juxtaposes the idyllic scenery of the Swiss Alps with stiff female bodies, their figures as haphazardly positioned as discarded dolls.  These unidentified women are purposefully left ambiguous, evoking a universal sense of loss and disequilibrium.  In this altered state of reality, stillness and silence permeate each image.  It is an almost post-apocalyptic quiet, the landscape punctuated with the man-made elements, crumbling monuments for a disappearing world.

Tokyo Hotel Story

Tokyo Hotel Story continues Daoust's exploration of female sexuality and the subversion of gender stereotypes. Over a four-month period Daoust engaged with the dominatrices at one of Tokyo’s premier S&M love hotels, the Alpha-In.  She photographed 39 women in their private rooms, surrounded by their equipment and dressed in the regalia that define their trade. This work takes the viewer beyond taboos, unveiling a universal human desire to escape reality, creating alternate worlds that oscillate between fantasy, truth and perversion.

Impersonating Mao, China

This photo-documentary captures the interior world of Zhang, a man who alternately appropriates the persona of Mao Zedong, founder of the People’s Republic of China. Shot on old Chinese film, the negatives were physically manipulated in the darkroom then sealed in amber-like resin to create an insubstantial world of illusion.  Each scene is an arresting balance of soft and sharp, faded memory colliding with an insistent present.  These images invite the viewer to reflect on notions of power and powerlessness, as a man seeks to make himself visible by taking on such a controversial persona.

China Dolls, China

China Dolls is a study of contemporary Chinese women, the role they play in society and the consequences of the country's one child policy. Photographed individually in a darkened room, Daoust completely strips the scene of external signifiers, spotlighting women who have, according to the artist, “remained in shadows.” These lyrical, aborted tableaux personify the feelings of otherness and otherworldliness that run through her work.

Each black and white print is hand-coloured and printed on ceramic tile, reinforcing the notion of the ‘China Doll’ and reflecting the fragile situation of the modern Chinese woman.

Korean Dreams, North Korea

Korean Dreams, is a complex series that probes the unsettling vacuity of North Korea.  Daoust's images reveal a country that seems to exist outside of time, as a carefully choreographed mirage. She has spent much of her career exploring the chimeric world of fantasy: the hidden desires and urges that compel people to dream, to dress up, to move beyond the bounds of convention and to escape from reality. With Korean Dreams, Daoust is exploring this escapist impulse not as an individual choice, but as a way of life forced upon an entire nation.

Selected publications

References

External links 

 Official Website Nathalie Daoust
 Hotel Luise in Berlin, room Cabaret decorated by artist Nathalie Daoust
 More Intelligent Life Interview
 Saatchi Gallery
 Tokyo Hotel Story
 Art das Kunstmagazin

1977 births
Living people
21st-century Canadian photographers
Canadian women photographers
Artists from Montreal
21st-century Canadian women artists